Arvin Dave de Leon Tolentino (born November 5, 1995) is a Filipino professional basketball player for the NorthPort Batang Pier of the Philippine Basketball Association (PBA). He was drafted 10th overall pick by the Barangay Ginebra San Miguel in the 2019 PBA draft.

Early life and high school career 
Tolentino grew up in Angono, Rizal. He first started playing basketball at 12 years old. He was trained by a friend of his father.

Throughout high school, he played for the Red Cubs of the San Beda University. In his time there, San Beda won the championship 5 straight times. He was on the NCAA Mythical Team and a Finals MVP.

Tolentino played in the 2013 SEAOIL NBTC Games, which showcases many players from various high schools around the country, and won Finals MVP. He also participated in the Adidas Nations Global 2013 and Slam Rising Stars Classic.

Tolentino received offers to play college varsity basketball from top Philippine universities such as Ateneo de Manila, De La Salle, National University, as well as his own alma mater, San Beda University. He also received offers from American universities Duke and Rhode Island. He committed to play college basketball to the Blue Eagles of the Ateneo de Manila University.

College career

Ateneo Blue Eagles (2014–2015) 
Tolentino debuted against the Adamson Soaring Falcons with 12 points. Against La Salle he had 14 points, 10 rebounds, and 2 blocks. In their match against the UP Fighting Maroons, he had 20 points and 8 rebounds. For these performances, he was given the nickname "A-Train". He finished the season as the Season 77 Rookie of the Year.

He didn't have a good start in Season 78, as he had to adjust to playing center, and started losing minutes. He averaged just 3 points in their first six games. He broke through that season in their game against the UST Growling Tigers, scoring 16 of his 20 points in the second half to give Ateneo the win. Their season was ended when Mac Belo hit a buzzer-beating shot in their semifinals series.

He failed to make Ateneo's grade requirements for the following season, so he was dropped by Ateneo.

FEU Tamaraws 
Tolentino transferred to FEU in time for Season 80, after Ateneo dropped him. In his first match against his former team, he scored 11 points, but Ateneo took the win. He had a career-high 23 points in their win against NU. He was suspended for one game after getting two unsportsmanlike fouls in his previous game. They made it to the Final Four where he faced his former team. He had 13 points as his team won Game 1. In Game 2, he had a turnover that allowed Ateneo to win the game in overtime.

The next season, Season 81, he switched his jersey number from #13 to #41. He was ejected from their game against Adamson after clotheslining Sean Manganti and served a one-game suspension. He was suspended for two games after hitting UST player Zach Huang in the face. He hit a game-winning three to send FEU to the Final Four, making up for his blunder the previous season. His college career ended when Ateneo beat them in their semifinal series.

Professional career

Barangay Ginebra San Miguel (2020–2022)
Tolentino applied for the 2019 PBA Draft. He was drafted 10th overall in the first round by the Barangay Ginebra San Miguel. In his third game for Ginebra, he scored 11 points against the Meralco Bolts. In his first semifinal game, he scored 13 points and had 5 rebounds. In his 2020 PBA Philippine Cup Finals debut, he had 14 points, 4 rebounds, and 3 steals, with his game-tying layup, as Ginebra won Game 1. Ginebra eventually won the championship. He also finished the season as a nominee for Rookie of the Year, and a member of the All-Rookie Team.

NorthPort Batang Pier (2022–present)
On September 20, 2022, Tolentino, along with Prince Caperal and a 2022 first-round pick, was traded to the NorthPort Batang Pier for Jamie Malonzo.

PBA career statistics

As of the end of 2022–23 season

Season-by-season averages

|-
| align=left | 
| align=left | Barangay Ginebra
| 21 || 15.3 || .305 || .246 || .833 || 2.5 || .7 || .2 || .3 || 4.5
|-
| align=left | 
| align=left | Barangay Ginebra
| 27 || 15.1 || .361 || .313 || .652 || 1.9 || .4 || .4 || .3 || 6.1
|-
| align=left rowspan=2| 
| align=left | Barangay Ginebra
| rowspan=2|32 || rowspan=2|31.1 || rowspan=2|.433 || rowspan=2|.388 || rowspan=2|.808 || rowspan=2|4.8 || rowspan=2|1.2 || rowspan=2|.9 || rowspan=2|.7 || rowspan=2|14.5
|-
| align=left | NorthPort
|- class="sortbottom"
| style="text-align:center;" colspan="2"|Career
| 80 || 21.6 || .392 || .342 || .784 || 3.2 || .8 || .5 || .5 || 9.0

National team career 
In his younger years, Tolentino played for the Philippines in numerous tournaments. He was a member of the RP U16 & U18 teams. In 2013, he played for the Philippines in the FIBA Asia 3x3 U18 Championship, along with Thirdy Ravena, Prince Rivero, and Kobe Paras.  That same team also played in the 2013 FIBA 3x3 U18 World Championships.

In 2022, Tolentino was one of the final cuts from the final Gilas Pilipinas roster for the fifth window of the FIBA World Cup 2023 Asian Qualifiers.

Personal life 
Tolentino is married to Brandy Kramer, younger sister of former PBA player Doug Kramer. They have a daughter.

References

External links
Arvin Tolentino at RealGM
Arvin Tolentino at PBA.ph 

1995 births
Living people
Ateneo Blue Eagles men's basketball players
Barangay Ginebra San Miguel draft picks
Barangay Ginebra San Miguel players
Basketball players from Rizal
FEU Tamaraws basketball players
NorthPort Batang Pier players
Philippine Basketball Association All-Stars
Power forwards (basketball)
San Beda University alumni
Small forwards